Nicolò is an Italian male given name. Another variation is Niccolò, most common in Tuscany. It may refer to:

 Nicolò Albertini, statesman
 Nicolò Amati, luthier
 Nicolò Barella, Italian footballer
 Nicolò Barattieri, Italian engineer
 Nicolò Brancaleon, artist
 Nicolò Egidi, chemist
 Nicolò Fagioli, Italian footballer
 Nicolò Gabrielli, composer
 Nicolò Gagliano, violin-maker
 Nicolò Isouard (1773-1818), French composer
 Nicolò Melli, Italian basketball player
 Nicolò Minato, poet
 Nicolò Pacassi, architect
 Nicolò Pollari, general
 Nicolo Rizzuto (1924–2010), Italian-Canadian mobster
 Nicolo Schiro, mobster
 Nicolò Zanon, judge
 Nicolò Zaniolo, italian footballer

See also
Niccolò (disambiguation)
Nicolao
San Nicolò (disambiguation)

Italian masculine given names